The 2014 Tour de Suisse was the 78th running of the Tour de Suisse cycling stage race. It began on 14 June with an individual time trial in Bellinzona and ended on 22 June in Saas-Fee; in total, the race consisted of nine stages. It was the seventeenth race of the 2014 UCI World Tour season. Rui Costa won the race for the third year in a row. Tony Martin led for almost all of the race, having gained an early advantage in the opening stage time trial. However, Costa was able to gain enough time on the climb at the end of the final stage to overhaul the deficit and in doing so set a record for the most consecutive victories in the race.

Teams
As the Tour de Suisse was a UCI World Tour event, all UCI ProTeams were invited automatically and obligated to send a squad. In addition four Professional Continental teams were given wildcard places

The 22 teams that competed in the race were:

Race overview

Stages

Stage 1
14 June 2014 — Bellinzona, individual time trial (ITT)

Stage 2
15 June 2014 — Bellinzona to Sarnen,

Stage 3
16 June 2014 — Sarden to Heiden,

Stage 4
17 June 2014 — Heiden to Ossingen,

Stage 5
18 June 2014 — Ossingen to Büren an der Aare,

Stage 6
19 June 2014 — Büren an der Aare to Delémont,

Stage 7
20 June 2014 — Worb, individual time trial (ITT)

Stage 8
21 June 2014 — Delémont to Verbier,

Stage 9
22 June 2014 — Martigny to Saas-Fee,

Classification leadership table
In the 2014 Tour de Suisse, three different jerseys were awarded. For the general classification, calculated by adding each cyclist's finishing times on each stage, and the leader received a yellow jersey. This classification was considered the most important of the Tour de Suisse, and the winner of the classification was considered the winner of the race. There was also a mountains classification, the leadership of which was marked by a red jersey. In the mountains classification, points were won by reaching the top of a climb before other cyclists, with more points available for the higher-categorised climbs; there were twenty-one categorised climbs in the race, split into five distinctive categories.

The third jersey represented the points classification, marked by a white-and-red jersey. In the points classification, cyclists got points for finishing highly in a stage. For stages 4, 5, 6 and 8, the win earned 25 points, second place earned 20 points, third 16, fourth 13, fifth 11, and one point fewer per place down to a single point for 15th. For all other stages, the win earned 15 points, second place earned 12 points, third 10, and one point fewer per place down to a single point for 12th. Points could also be earned at intermediate sprints for finishing in the top 3 at intermediate sprint points during each stage on a 6–3–1 scale. There was also a classification for teams, in which the times of the best three cyclists per team on each stage were added together; the leading team at the end of the race was the team with the lowest total time.

Notes

References

External links

 

Tour de Suisse
Tour de Suisse
Tour de Suisse